Kevin Kennedy may refer to:

Kevin Kennedy (actor) (born 1961), English actor
Kevin Kennedy (baseball) (born 1954), former manager in American Major League Baseball
Kevin Kennedy (cricketer) (born 1945), New Zealand cricketer
Kevin J. Kennedy (born 1956), former CEO of JDSU, current CEO of Avaya
Kevin B. Kennedy Jr., United States Air Force general
Kevin Kennedy, screenwriter of The Assassination of Richard Nixon